Cusco–Collao (Spanish, also Cuzco–Collao) or Qusqu–Qullaw (Quechua) is a collective term used for Quechua dialects that have aspirated and ejective plosives, apparently borrowed from Aymaran languages. They include Cusco Quechua, Puno Quechua, North Bolivian Quechua, and South Bolivian Quechua. Together with Ayacucho Quechua, which is mutually intelligible, they form the Southern Quechua language.

In 1975, the term "Cusco-Collao" was coined by the government of Juan Velasco Alvarado as the name of one of six officially recognized regional varieties of Quechua in Peru, and is still used in both Spanish and Quechua forms in publications of the Peruvian government and SIL International.

In linguistic terms, the group is problematic. Concerning vocabulary, Cusco Quechua is closest to Ayacucho Quechua, with which it has 96% lexical similarity, whereas Puno Quechua and the Bolivian Quechua varieties have borrowed more lexicon and morphology from Aymara and Spanish (e.g. the diminutive suffix -ita, -itu, -sita, -situ instead of -cha: cf. "small stone": rumisitu in Bolivia vs. rumicha in both Cusco and Ayacucho). Typical for Cusco-Collao dialects is the appearance of subordinating conjunctions, e.g. imaraykuchus (because) and sichus (if), or relative pronouns, e.g. pitachus (whom) or imachus (that, what), which are uncommon in Ayacucho Quechua and other Quechua varieties. Conjunctions like imaraykuchus are by far most common in the Bolivian dialects. Otherwise, subordination in Quechua can be expressed by means of suffixes and infixes like -pti- and -spa or (to substitute relative clauses) -q, -sqa and -na.

See also 
 Quechuan and Aymaran spelling shift

Bibliography 
 Antonio Cusihuamán (1976): Diccionario Quechua Cuzco-Collao [- Castellano y vice versa]. Ministerio de educación del Perú
 Antonio Cusihuamán (1976): Gramática Quechua Cuzco-Collao. Ministerio de educación del Perú

External links 
 Yachakuqkunapa Simi Qullqa - Qusqu Qullaw. Qhichwa Simipi (monolingual Quechua and bilingual Quechua-Spanish dictionary)
 Nonato Rufino Chuquimamani Valer, Carmen Gladis Alosilla Morales, Victoria Choque Valer: Qullaw Qichwapa Simi Qullqan. Lima, 2014

References 

Languages of Bolivia
Languages of Peru
Southern Quechua